The 1986 USC Trojans football team represented the University of Southern California (USC) in the 1986 NCAA Division I-A football season. In their fourth and final year under head coach Ted Tollner, the Trojans compiled a 7–5 record (5–3 against conference opponents), finished in a three-way tie for fourth place in the Pacific-10 Conference (Pac-10), and outscored their opponents by a combined total of 264 to 239.

Quarterback Rodney Peete led the team in passing, completing 160 of 305 passes for 2,138 yards with 10 touchdowns and 15 interceptions.  Ryan Knight led the team in rushing with 148 carries for 536 yards and seven touchdowns. Ken Henry led the team in receiving yards with 43 catches for 807 yards and seven touchdowns.

Schedule

Roster

Rankings

Game summaries

Illinois

at No. 9 Baylor

    
    
    
    
    

Visiting USC stunned the No. 9 Bears on Don Shafer's 32-yard field goal on the final play. Baylor dominated the game statistically, outgaining USC , holding a 26–11 advantage is first downs (including not allowing USC a first down through three quarters), and maintaining a 15-minute advantage in time of possession (37:47 to 22:13). Mirroring the result of last year's matchup, the unranked road team knocked off the host with an AP top ten ranking.

No. 6 Washington

vs. No. 10 Auburn (Florida Citrus Bowl)

References

USC
USC Trojans football seasons
USC Trojans football